The Banc de pêche de Paspébiac is a complex of ten buildings in Paspébiac, Quebec, Canada. The buildings were built between 1783 and 1900 by fishing companies from Jersey.

The Paspébiac fishing bank  is situated on Chaleur Bay, on a dune closing the Paspébiac lagoon in the Gaspé Peninsula.

The Entrepôt Lebouthillier is the largest building on site.

Heritage designation
The fishing bank was classified as a Bien culturel du Québec on July 17, 1981 by the Ministry of Culture of Quebec.

On June 15, 2001, the fishing bank was designated as a National Historic Site of Canada, recognizing both its architecture and its social, economic and historical importance in the cod fisheries.

References

External links
 Site historique du Banc-de-Pêche-de-Paspébiac - official site

National Historic Sites in Quebec
Buildings and structures in Gaspésie–Îles-de-la-Madeleine
Fishing areas of the Atlantic Ocean
Fisheries in Canada
Commercial buildings completed in 1783
Heritage sites in Quebec (Cultural Heritage Act)
Museums in Gaspésie–Îles-de-la-Madeleine
Open-air museums in Canada
Industry museums in Canada
Maritime museums in Quebec